Joseph Michael Poole (born August 12, 1976), better known by his stage name Wednesday 13, is an American singer and musician. Apart from his solo career, he was the frontman of the horror punk/heavy metal band Murderdolls and has also played in several other bands, including Maniac Spider Trash, Frankenstein Drag Queens from Planet 13, Bourbon Crow, and Gunfire 76.

Career

Psycho Opera and Maniac Spider Trash 
Poole's musical career began in 1992 when he played guitar in the band Mizery, which later became Psycho Opera, with Abby Normal (guitar), Jeff Washam (drums), Michael Patrick (bass guitar) and Todd Cage (lead vocals). Poole left the band to form Maniac Spider Trash as lead vocalist, with Normal (guitar) and Patrick (bass guitar), joined by Sicko Zero on drums. Poole fronted the band from 1992 to 1996. The band released one EP, Dumpster Mummies, on Dead Hell Records in 1994. An album, Murder Happy Fairytales, was recorded in 1995 but not released until October 2010.

Frankenstein Drag Queens from Planet 13 

Poole went on to form the Frankenstein Drag Queens from Planet 13, which included Normal and Zero. The band had several different guitarists, bass guitarists and drummers over the years, leaving Poole as the only original member. He wrote and produced every album by Frankenstein Drag Queens from Planet 13. Between 1996 and 2002, Frankenstein Drag Queens from Planet 13 released five studio albums and six EPs with various members. They also appeared on tribute albums for Alice Cooper and Sweet. Zero was the last member to leave. Shortly after, Poole formed another line-up before joining Murderdolls in 2002. In May 2006, the band announced a reunion, which was followed by a tour with Alice Cooper and a box set of the band's complete discography, entitled Little Box of Horrors. This line-up had Zero on drums and Normal on bass guitar. The band broke up once again shortly after the box set was released.

Murderdolls 

Poole was contacted by Joey Jordison of Slipknot and was asked to join Jordison's new horror punk band, Murderdolls. Originally formed as a collaboration between Jordison and Tripp Eisen of Static-X and Dope, Poole became the driving force of the band after he moved from bass guitar to lead vocals. Murderdolls released one EP in 2002, Right to Remain Violent, to promote a forthcoming album the same year, Beyond the Valley of the Murderdolls. Most of the songs on the album were re-recorded versions of songs by Poole's previous band, Frankenstein Drag Queens from Planet 13. Two singles were released from the album, including a cover of Billy Idol's "White Wedding". The album reached No. 40 on the UK album chart.

Murderdolls played their last show on January 17, 2004. After this, they broke up, with Jordison returning to Slipknot.Both Poole and Jordison maintained that the band did not split up for good, and that they would return to record a second album in the future. In February 2010, while on a solo tour in Australia, Poole told Drum Media, "We're possibly going to do another Wednesday record, record it in the summer and have it out around Halloween. We're in talks right now to do another Murderdolls album. So right now I don't know which of the two is going to happen, of course if Murderdolls is possible then we have to do that, it's gotta be the number one priority. It's just talks right now. We're having the same conversations that we were having in the very beginning of the band. Right now, we're just trying to get a game plan together."

In March 2010, Jordison told Kerrang! magazine that Murderdolls had reunited to work with the producer Chris Harris. Jordison said, "It's been an ongoing conversation between Wednesday and I from 2006 until now. We were bored with everything out there, and thought we had something to piss people off and shake things up. Everything is such a product or a fucking formula these days... fuck formula! Fuck the norm!" Murderdolls released their second album, Women and Children Last, on August 31, 2010. In March 2013, Wednesday 13 announced in an interview that the Murderdolls had split up for good in 2011.

Wednesday 13 

After the Murderdolls broke up in 2004, Poole went on a solo tour of the United Kingdom in March, called the Graveyard A Go-Go tour. For his live performances, he was joined by members of the horror punk band Death Becomes You, though this was not meant to be permanent. Poole returned to North Carolina in June 2004 and began to put together a more permanent band, with whom he would perform under the Wednesday 13 name. He brought in the former Frankenstein Drag Queens member, Ikky, on guitar. The band is heavily influenced by KISS and Alice Cooper, while not straying far from Poole's previous horror punk projects. In September 2004, Ikky was replaced by Matt Montgomery. Wednesday 13 toured Europe in November 2004 on the Look What the Bats Dragged in tour. Some of the dates were supported by the English rockers Viking Skull.

In 2005, after touring, Poole released his first album Transylvania 90210, and made a music video for the track "I Walked with a Zombie", depicting the band members in footage from the original Night of the Living Dead horror movie. Following the album's release, the group embarked on a tour of the United Kingdom, entitled Tour from the Crypt. Also in 2005, they played on the main stage of the Download Festival at Donington and opened some shows for Alice Cooper around Halloween.

Poole left Roadrunner Records before signing a new deal with Rykodisc, with whom he released Fang Bang on September 12, 2006. The European version of the album contains a cover of Motörhead's "R.A.M.O.N.E.S." and the Japanese edition has the same track listing as the European CD, with a bonus song entitled "Good Day to Die". The American edition has "Burn the Flames", a Roky Erickson cover version, as its only bonus track. Skeletons was released in the US on April 29, 2008, available exclusively through Hot Topic locations. It was released in the UK on May 12, 2008, by DR2 Records.

On November 14, 2008, Poole released his first live album, Fuck It, We'll Do It Live. The CD/DVD package was recorded in 2008 at Crocodile Rock in Allentown, Pennsylvania. Wednesday 13 released it exclusively through Hot Topic, just as he had for Skeletons. A two-track digital download entitled Xanaxtasy was released on December 24, 2010, through iTunes. The release was announced on Wednesday 13's Facebook page on December 20, 2010, and contains two songs recorded during his 2009 sessions. Of the two songs, "Xanaxtasy" was previously released in the Bloodwork EP limited edition vinyl and "It's a Wonderful Lie" was previously released on his limited edition vinyl release From Here to the Hearse. During May 2011, Poole released a remix album/EP titled Re-Animated and announced that a portion of all sales for the first month would be donated to the American Red Cross.

On Wednesday, July 13, Wednesday released the track listing for Calling All Corpses via Bravewords. The album was released on October 11 in the US and October 10 elsewhere. He released his fifth album, The Dixie Dead, on February 19, 2013, and his sixth album, Monsters of the Universe: Come Out and Plague, on January 12, 2015. He his seventh album, Condolences, was released on June 2, 2017, after signing with Nuclear Blast.

Bourbon Crow 
Since 2005, under the alias of Buck Bourbon, Poole has maintained an outlaw country side project called Bourbon Crow. Wednesday 13 was in contact with the former drummer Jeff Washam from Psycho Opera and was going to tour on the East Coast project. Scheduling prevented Washam doing the tour. The band released its first album in 2006, Highway to Hangovers, and a second album, Long Way to the Bottom, in 2009. In 2015, the band released a third album, Off the Wagon on the Rocks.

Gunfire 76 
Poole teamed up with Todd Youth of The Chelsea Smiles to write and record an album with a more glam rock sound and without any horror themes, under the band name Gunfire 76. Rough mixes of the album's title track, "Casualties & Tragedies", were uploaded onto the band's Myspace page on August 12, 2009, for the fans to have an idea of what the band sounded like. The album was released on October 6, 2009. Gunfire 76 toured from December 2009 to January 2010 with Bullets and Octane on the First Blood tour.

Personal life 
Poole is originally from Lexington, North Carolina. He has one daughter with his ex-wife Roxanne and has a granddaughter who was born in 2017.

The 2019 album Necrophaze was the first Wednesday 13 album recorded sober by Poole. He has maintained sobriety and continues to tour.

Discography

Studio albums

Extended plays

Compilation and live albums

Singles 
 "Bad Things" (2005)
 "I Walked with a Zombie" (2005)
 "Xanaxtasy" (2010)
 "Scream Baby Scream (Ghost Boo-Ty Mix)" / "Xanaxtasy" (2011)
 "Something Wicked This Way Comes" (2011)
 "Serpent Society" (2015)
 "Decompose" (2019)
 "Bring Your Own Blood" (2019)
 "Films" (2019)
 "Devil Inside" (2020)
 "You’re So Hideous" (2022)

Other album appearances

Maniac Spider Trash 
Dumpster Mummies (1994)
Murder Happy Fairytales (2011) (Recorded in 1995)

Frankenstein Drag Queens from Planet 13 
The Late, Late, Late Show (1996)
Night of the Living Drag Queens (1998)
Songs from the Recently Deceased (2000)
Viva Las Violence (2001)
6 Years, 6 Feet Under the Influence (2004)
Little Box of Horrors (2006)

Murderdolls 
Right to Remain Violent (2002)
Beyond the Valley of the Murderdolls (2002)
Women and Children Last (2010)

Bourbon Crow 
Highway to Hangovers (2006)
Long Way to the Bottom (2009)
Off the Wagon on the Rocks (2015)

Gunfire 76 
Casualties & Tragedies (Oct 6, 2009)

 "Let's Kill the Hero"
 "Casualties and Tragedies"
 "Nothing's All I Need"
 "Los Angel-less"
 "Rocket to Nowhere"
 "Something for the Suffering"
 "One More Reason to Hate You"
 "Tell You Like It Is"
 "What Did You Expect"
 "Back to the Gutter"
 "Get Me Through the Night"

Filmography 
Natural Born Weirdos (1998)
Beyond the Valley of the Murderdolls Deluxe edition DVD (2002)
Dawson's Creek S06Ep6 "Living Dead Girl" – as "The Band" (2002)
The Transvestite Chainsaw Massacre (2006)
Symphony for the Devil (2006) (Cameo appearance)
Wednesday 13's Weirdo A Go-Go (2008)
Fuck It, We'll Do It Live (2008)
Women and Children Last Deluxe edition DVD (2010)
That Metal Show – "Alice Cooper/Jack Russell" (2012) (Stump the Trunk contestant)
Scream Britain Scream (2014)
South of Hell: 666 Days on the Road (2017)

References

External links 

1976 births
21st-century American singers
American male singers
American rock singers
Horror punk musicians
Living people
Murderdolls members
Napalm Records artists
Place of birth missing (living people)
Singers from North Carolina